Xavier Giannoli (born 7 March 1972) is a French film director, screenwriter and producer. In 2010, he was named a Chevalier in the Ordre des Arts et des Lettres.

Filmography

As director / screenwriter

As producer

References

External links

1972 births
Living people
French film directors
French male screenwriters
French screenwriters
French film producers
Chevaliers of the Ordre des Arts et des Lettres